Coburg railway station is located on the Upfield line in Victoria, Australia. It serves the northern Melbourne suburb of Coburg, and it opened on 9 September 1884.

History

Coburg station opened as a terminus on 9 September 1884, when the line was extended from North Melbourne. On 8 October 1889, the line was extended to Somerton. On 13 July 1903, the line beyond Coburg was closed, but reopened to Fawkner on 13 November 1906. On 2 December 1920, electrification to Coburg occurred. Like the suburb itself, the station was named after the Duke of Edinburgh, a member of the house of Saxe-Coburg and Gotha. At the time of the renaming from Pentridge to Coburg in 1870, the Duke was planning a visit to the colony.

In 1957 and 1958, a number of sidings were abolished at the station.

In 1962, boom barriers replaced hand-operated gates at the former Bell Street level crossing, which was located at the Down end of the station. In 1972, the former ground level station building was refurbished. By 1978, the former goods yard, which was located to the west of the station, was closed.

A disused signal box is located below the elevated railway line at the Up end of the station, directly opposite the former Munro Street level crossing. It was provided in 1928 to control the interlocked gates at the former level crossing, and replaced the original signal box. In 1983, boom barriers replaced these interlocked gates.

Although the line from Coburg to Fawkner was duplicated in 1959, Coburg continued to have only one side platform, used by trains travelling in both directions. In 1995, an additional platform (Platform 2) was provided at the former ground level station. It was built along the former No.3 road, which was booked out of service in 1992. On 28 June 1996, Coburg was upgraded to a Premium Station. In 1997, a crossover was provided at the Up end of the station. However, all other remaining crossovers and points were abolished at that same time.

On 7 May 2019, the Level Crossing Removal Project announced that the Bell Street and Munro Street level crossings were to be grade separated. On 14 December 2020, a new elevated station opened after the completion of these works, replacing the previous ground level station, which closed on 27 July 2020.

Platforms and services

Coburg has two side platforms. It is serviced by Metro Trains' Upfield line services.

Platform 1:
  all stations services to Flinders Street

Platform 2:
  all stations services to Upfield

Transport links

Broadmeadows Bus Service operates one route via Coburg station, under contract to Public Transport Victoria:
 : Campbellfield Plaza Shopping Centre – Coburg

Dysons operates three routes via Coburg station, under contract to Public Transport Victoria:
 : Eltham station – Glenroy station (via Lower Plenty)
 : Eltham station – Glenroy station (via Greensborough)
 : Macleod – Pascoe Vale station

Kinetic Melbourne operates one SmartBus route via Coburg station, under contract to Public Transport Victoria:
  : Altona station – Mordialloc

Moreland Buslines operates one route via Coburg station, under contract to Public Transport Victoria:
 : Strathmore station – East Coburg

Ventura Bus Lines operates two routes via Coburg station, under contract to Public Transport Victoria:
 : Coburg – Reservoir
 : Gowrie station – Northland Shopping Centre

Yarra Trams operates one route via Coburg station:
 : Coburg North – Flinders Street station (Elizabeth Street CBD)

Gallery

References

External links
 
 Melway map at street-directory.com.au

Premium Melbourne railway stations
Railway stations in Melbourne
Railway stations in Australia opened in 1884
Railway stations in the City of Merri-bek